The 2015 E3 Harelbeke was the 58th edition of the E3 Harelbeke cycling race, which took place on 27 March and was the sixth race of the 2015 UCI World Tour. The defending champion was Peter Sagan, who won the 2014 edition in a four-man sprint. The race, while important in its own right as part of the spring classics season, was seen as an important part of riders' preparation for the 2015 Tour of Flanders, one of the cycling monuments that took place on many of the same roads the following week.

E3 Harelbeke took place on roads in Flanders, starting and ending in the town of Harelbeke. The primary difficulty in the race was the series of short climbs known as hellingen, some of which were cobbled; most of these came in the middle part of the race, with a fairly flat final part.

The key move of the race was made on the Oude Kwaremont by Geraint Thomas, Zdeněk Štybar and Sagan. With approximately  remaining, Thomas attacked and was able to take a solo victory, and became the first British rider to win the race. Štybar chased and was able to take second place, but Sagan was caught by the main peloton. Štybar's teammate Matteo Trentin won the bunch sprint for third place.

The other major feature of the race was a succession of crashes. Sep Vanmarcke slipped on the Paterberg, though this resulted in nothing worse than a broken shoe; however, a major crash early in the race caused significant problems for a number of riders. The worst affected was Fabian Cancellara, one of the major favourites for victory; he broke two vertebrae, ruling him out of the remainder of the classics season.

Poster controversy 

About a month before the race took place, in February 2015, the race organisers published a publicity poster for the race. This poster showed a woman, with her dress raised and underwear with the race logo visible. A cyclist's gloved hand was reaching out apparently to pinch the woman's bottom. The poster bore the caption Wie knijpt ze in Harelbeke?. This was a reference to Peter Sagan's actions after the 2013 Tour of Flanders, when he pinched the bottom of Maja Leye during the podium ceremony after the race.

The poster caused significant controversy, especially as the 2011 race had also featured a poster viewed as sexist. The 2015 poster was described as "demeaning" and "misogynistic". The poster was criticised by the Union Cycliste Internationale (UCI) and by the Belgian Jury of Advertising Ethics. In March, a few weeks before the race was held, the poster was withdrawn and replaced.

Route 
It started in the Belgian municipality of Harelbeke, where there was a  neutral zone before the official start. Initially, the route headed north, but after a short distance it turned south-east to reach the town of Avelgem after . The route then turned north-east through Oudenaarde and reached the first climb, the Katteberg, after . The route briefly went south-east again to reach the second climb, the Leberg,  later. Between the Katteberg and the Leberg, there were two flat sections of cobbles, the Holleweg and the Haaghoek. The race then entered a long loop without any significant climbs, though it did include the Paddestraat, another flat section of cobbles. The loop turned west at this point, travelling through Geraardsbergen after .

The third climb came after  at La Houppe. The course then turned north to reach the Berg Stene climb after . The next four climbs came in quick succession over the next : the Boigneberg, the Eikenberg (the first of the cobbled climbs), the Stationberg and the Taaienberg. A  flat section followed, as the course travelled south-west through Ronse, before a turn to the north to tackle the next climb. This was the Knokteberg, which came after , and it was followed by another turn to the east and the climb of the Hotondberg after . The Rotelenberg (after ) and the Kortekeer (after ) were the next two climbs as the route again approached Oudenaarde.

With  remaining, the riders climbed the Kapelberg. The next section was expected to be the key part of the race: the climbs of the Paterberg and the Oude Kwaremont. The Oude Kwaremont was the final cobbled climb of the day; at the top of the climb there were  left to the end of the race. In past editions of the race this was the section where a decisive breakaway was formed; the combination of the two climbs was also a major feature of the Tour of Flanders.

The route continued south to the penultimate climb of the day, the Karnemelkbeekstraat, with  remaining, then turned north-west for the final part of the race. It was expected that riders dropped in the hilly section of the course would try to regain contact on this section. The route continued west and finished where it had started in Harelbeke.

Teams 
As E3 Harelbeke was a UCI World Tour event, all 17 UCI WorldTeams were invited automatically and were obliged to send a squad. Seven Professional Continental teams received wildcard invitations.

Pre-race favourites 

E3 Harelbeke was part of the spring classics season. It was therefore suited to the riders who rode in the several other similar races through the early part of the season, such as Omloop Het Nieuwsblad, the Tour of Flanders and Dwars door Vlaanderen, which were often raced over the same roads.

The winner of the 2014 E3 Harelbeke, Peter Sagan was one of the major pre-race favourites, although his early-season form had been mixed and he had won just one race in 2015 to that point. The team's preparation for the race was also affected by the suspension of the team manager, Bjarne Riis, by the owner Oleg Tinkov, following the team's poor results.

The other principal favourite was Fabian Cancellara, who won the race in 2010, 2011 and 2013. Although he too had had a relatively unsuccessful Milan–San Remo, finishing seventh, he had shown good form in other races in the season. However, one of his most important teammates, Stijn Devolder, crashed in Dwars door Vlaanderen earlier in the week, potentially affecting Cancellara's chances.

The  team was also expected to feature in the race. Although Tom Boonen, the leader of the team and a five-time winner of the race, had crashed at Paris–Nice and was absent with injury, the team had several other riders who could compete for the win. These included Niki Terpstra, who was second in 2014, Zdeněk Štybar and Stijn Vandenbergh.

Other favourites included Greg Van Avermaet, Sep Vanmarcke, Alexander Kristoff, Ian Stannard and Geraint Thomas (both ). Nairo Quintana also entered the race as he had in Dwars door Vlaanderen; he was preparing for cobbled stages at the Tour de France rather than competing for the win.

Race report

Early stages 
The race started without Filippo Pozzato, the 2009 champion, who missed the race due to illness. Shortly after the start, a breakaway was formed by six riders. A water bottle came loose and caused a large crash in the main peloton. A large number of riders crashed, including Fabian Cancellara, Sebastian Langeveld, Robert Wagner, Lars Boom and John Degenkolb. Most of the riders were able to continue, but Cancellara, one of the favourites to win the race, was forced to abandon it in significant pain. It was immediately clear that he would miss Gent–Wevelgem; soon afterwards it was announced that he had two broken vertebrae and would miss the rest of the spring classics season.

Shortly afterwards, the peloton climbed the Taaienberg, where Daniel Oss, Matteo Trentin and Matti Breschel attacked and were soon joined by Tiesj Benoot. Nairo Quintana was dropped during this period of racing and abandoned the race. Van Ginneken was dropped, leaving three riders in the leading group.

Paterberg−Oude Kwaremont 

The riders then entered the crucial section of the Paterberg and Oude Kwaremont. Devenyns attacked alone from the breakaway group, while Sep Vanmarcke attacked the peloton. Vanmarcke was riding the climb in the gutter to one side of the road. He slipped in the mud and had to put a foot down on the cobblestones; this damaged his shoe and left him unable to clip into his pedal, reducing his ability to apply power on the climbs. He continued with the broken shoe over the Paterberg and Oude Kwaremont until he was able to change it on a flat section of road. Vanmarcke was in a small group of riders that earned a gap on the Paterberg, but they were caught soon afterwards. At this point there a chase group of around 30 riders, half a minute behind Devenyns as they entered the Oude Kwaremont.

Marcus Burghardt led the peloton on the first part of the climb, until he was attacked by Geraint Thomas, who was followed by Zdeněk Štybar. After a brief period, Peter Sagan bridged across to Thomas and Štybar; the three riders then caught and dropped Devenyns. The gap between the leading three and the peloton quickly reached 25 seconds, then was reduced to 15 seconds by BMC.

Final stages 
The gap expanded again to 45 seconds at the foot of the final climb, the Tiegemberg; on the climb, BMC's pressure reduced the lead by 20 seconds and dropped several riders from the chasing group. At the top, with  left, Oss was leading the group, while Greg Van Avermaet, BMC's team leader, was a couple of places further back. Van Avermaet was riding on the wheel of Alexandr Kolobnev, who missed a corner and was forced to brake. Van Avermaet also braked; this action caused him to somersault over his handlebars and crash, injuring him and taking him out of contention for the rest of the race.

With Van Avermaet injured, BMC were no longer riding at the front of the group and the breakaway's lead quickly grew to 50 seconds, with only 's Luca Paolini leading the chase. The gap was reduced slightly to 40 seconds as the riders entered the last . With  left, Thomas attacked the lead group and Štybar waited for Sagan to respond. Sagan, however, was unable to chase Thomas, who built a gap ahead of the other two. Štybar eventually gave chase, but he was unable to catch Thomas. After the race, he attributed his loss to two seconds' hesitation. Thomas continued alone to win the race ahead of Štybar by 25 seconds. Sagan, meanwhile, was both caught and left behind by the main chase group and finished 30th, over a minute behind Thomas. In the main peloton, Matteo Trentin was led out by his teammates Stijn Vandenbergh and Yves Lampaert. Another teammate, Niki Terpstra, was able to block Alexander Kristoff as he attempted the sprint and Trentin took the third podium place, 38 seconds behind Thomas and 13 seconds behind Štybar.

Result

References

External links 

 
 

E3 Harelbeke
E3 Harelbeke
E3 Harelbeke